Gabriel Andrés Cárcamo Riveros (born 27 May 1987) is a Chilean footballer.

His last club was Deportes Puerto Montt.

External links
 
 

1987 births
Living people
Chilean footballers
Puerto Montt footballers
San Antonio Unido footballers
Deportes Melipilla footballers
Everton de Viña del Mar footballers
Chilean Primera División players
Primera B de Chile players
Association football midfielders